Balotra railway station is a railway station in Barmer district, Rajasthan. Its code is BLT. It serves Balotra city. The station consists of 2 platforms. Passenger, Express, and Superfast trains halt here. As of 2021, the station has no train shed

Trains

The following trains halt at Balotra in both directions:

 Yesvantpur–Barmer AC Express
 Malani Express
 Kalka–Barmer Express
 Barmer–Guwahati Express
 Barmar–Rishikesh Express

References

Railway stations in Barmer district
Jodhpur railway division